Tanya Hope is an Indian actress and model who appears in Kannada, Telugu, and Tamil films. Hope started modeling and became Miss India Kolkata 2015. She was a finalist of Femina Miss India 2015. She debuted in 2016 with the Telugu film Appatlo Okadundevadu.

Early life
Tanya Hope was born and brought up in Bangalore. Her father Ravi Puravankara is a businessman. She went to Sacred Heart Girls High School in Bangalore. She pursued her graduation in international relations at the University of Westminster, England. She attended modeling training in Pune, at Tiara Training Studios. In 2015, Hope won the FBB Femina Miss India Kolkata.

Career

After debuting in Telugu films with Appatlo Okadundevadu in 2016, she played the role of A.C.P. Catherine in another Telugu movie Patel S. I. R. released in 2017 starring Jagapati Babu. Hope's first Tamil movie is Thadam, directed by Magizh Thirumeni. She is one of the three heroines along with Vidya Pradeep and Smruthi Venkat. She is playing Jessie in the Kannada film Home Minister starring Upendra and directed by Sujay k. Srihari. She stars in Paper Boy with Santosh Sobhan.

Hope was one of the lead actresses in Darshan’s 51st film Yajamana. She appeared in the film's  hit song "Basanni" in the titular role.

Filmography

Awards and nominations

References

External links

Indian film actresses
Female models from Bangalore
Actresses in Telugu cinema
Actresses from Bangalore
Actresses in Kannada cinema
21st-century Indian actresses
Living people
Alumni of the University of Westminster
Year of birth missing (living people)